The Columbia Gorge AVA is an American Viticultural Area which includes land surrounding the Columbia River Gorge, straddling the border between Oregon and Washington.  Due to the significant gradations of climate and geography found in the gorge, this AVA exhibits a wide range of terroir in a relatively small region; it is marketed as a "world of wine in 40 miles".

Description 
The Columbia Gorge AVA consists of four counties; Hood River and Wasco counties in Oregon, and Skamania and Klickitat counties in Washington.  The region stretches from Hood River, Oregon and Underwood, Washington in the west, to Rowena, Oregon and Lyle, Washington in the east.  It includes the river valleys of the Hood River and Deschutes River in Oregon, and the Klickitat River and White Salmon River in Washington.

As this region lies to the east of the summits of nearby Mount Hood and Mount Adams, it is in rain shadow of these Cascade volcanoes. The region is significantly drier than the Portland metropolitan area to the west. Elevation in the region varies considerably, increasing as one travels from the Columbia River into the plateaus on either side, and the strong Columbia Gorge winds also play a factor in the region's climate. This allows a wide variety of grapes to be grown in the Columbia Gorge.

The region has nearly 40 vineyards, growing a wide variety of grapes, including Syrah, Pinot noir, Chardonnay, Gewürztraminer, Zinfandel, Cabernet Sauvignon, Pinot gris, Riesling, and Sangiovese.

References

External links
Columbia Gorge Winegrowers

American Viticultural Areas
Geography of Hood River County, Oregon
Geography of Klickitat County, Washington
Oregon wine
Geography of Skamania County, Washington
Geography of Wasco County, Oregon
Washington (state) wine
2004 establishments in Oregon
2004 establishments in Washington (state)